Edward Barber may refer to:
 Edward Barber (VC) (1893–1915), British soldier during World War I and Victoria Cross recipient
 Edward Barber (minister) (died c. 1674), English Baptist minister
 Edward Barber (priest) (1841–1914), Anglican clergyman
 Edward Thaddeus Barleycorn Barber (1865–1948), Methodist minister on the island of Fernando Po
 Edward Barber (actor) (born 2000), British-Filipino actor
 Edward Barber (designer) (born 1966), British industrial designer